Comet C/2010 X1 (Elenin) is an Oort cloud comet discovered by Russian amateur astronomer Leonid Elenin on December 10, 2010, through remote control of the International Scientific Optical Network's robotic observatory near Mayhill in the U.S. state of New Mexico. The discovery was made using the automated asteroids discovery program CoLiTec. At the time of discovery, the comet had an apparent magnitude of 19.5, making it about 150,000 times fainter than can be seen with the naked eye. The discoverer, Leonid Elenin, originally estimated that the comet nucleus was 3–4 km in diameter, but more recent estimates place the pre-breakup size of the comet at 2 km. Comet Elenin started disintegrating in August 2011, and as of mid-October 2011 was not visible even using large ground-based telescopes.

Brightness
In April 2011, the comet was around magnitude 15 (roughly the brightness of Pluto), with a coma (expanding tenuous dust atmosphere) estimated to be about 80,000 km in diameter.  the coma had exceeded 100,000 km, and  it had exceeded 200,000 km. Estimates of the comet's visual brightness varied from 13.1 to 13.8 magnitude between May 22 and June 4, were approaching 10 by late July 2011, and were around 8.3 as of mid August 2011. Even at a magnitude of 8.3, the comet was about 5 times fainter than the naked eye can see under a completely dark sky. On 19 August 2011 comet Elenin was hit by a coronal mass ejection (CME). The comet started disintegrating,  as did comet C/1999 S4.  As of mid September 2011 the comet had become dimmer than magnitude 10.5, and appeared around magnitude 12 as seen by STEREO-A.  the comet is projected to be about magnitude 14 and fading. By mid-October 2011 there had been no confirmed ground based sighting of Comet Elenin even using the  Faulkes Telescope North with a limiting magnitude of around 20.5. The dust cloud remnants of Comet Elenin started to become visible to ground-based telescopes around 21 October 2011. The post-disintegration appearance of C/2010 X1 has been visually compared to the debris field of Shoemaker-Levy 9 as seen on 23 June 1993.

Between August 1 and August 12 of 2011, NASA repeatedly rolled the STEREO-B spacecraft to view the forward scattering of light as the spacecraft, comet, and Sun aligned. , Comet Elenin was visible in STEREO-B without rolling the craft. Because it disintegrated, SOHO failed to detect the forward scattering of light in late September. Because the orbit of Elenin is nearly coincident with the ecliptic plane with an inclination of only 1.84°, the comet entered forward-scattering geometry from STEREO-B, SOHO, and Earth. Had the comet not disintegrated, it would have allowed the dust scattering function to be studied simultaneously from two different locations.

Before the August fading of the comet, the Minor Planet Center ephemeris projected that the originally bright comet Elenin would reach about 6th magnitude in September and October 2011, but the brightness depends on the activity level of the coma. But because Elenin disintegrated, it did not become visible to the naked eye or binoculars. Elenin made its closest apparent pass in the night sky to Comet 45P/Honda–Mrkos–Pajdušáková on the morning of October 8, and moved apparently close to Mars on October 15. The comet came to opposition at 178° from the Sun on March 14, 2011 and came to opposition again on November 22, 2011 at 175° from the Sun. The minimum angle between the Sun and comet occurred on September 26 (1.9°), and between July 28 and October 10 the comet was less than 45 degrees from the Sun.

Original and future orbit
Given the orbital eccentricity of this object, its orbital period is not a fixed value, because it is frequently perturbed by the gravity of the planets. Near perihelion, using an August 2011 epoch, Kazuo Kinoshita shows C/2010 X1 to have a heliocentric orbital period of 600,000 years, though more perturbations will occur.  For objects at such high eccentricity, the Sun's barycentric coordinates are more stable than heliocentric coordinates. The orbit of a long-period comet is properly obtained when the osculating orbit is computed at an epoch after leaving the planetary region and is calculated with respect to the center of mass of the Solar System. Using JPL Horizons with an observed orbital arc of 271 days, the barycentric orbital elements for epoch 2500 generate a hyperbolic orbit with an eccentricity of 1.0004.

Elenin was probably in the outer Oort cloud with a loosely bound chaotic orbit that was easily perturbed by passing stars.

References

External links 
 Orbital simulation from JPL (2-body JAVA applet) / Horizons Ephemeris
 Elements and Ephemeris for C/2010 X1 (Elenin) – Minor Planet Center
 Comet Elenin FAQ (Leonid Elenin)
 Finder chart for Comet Elenin for June 2011 (near 48 LEO)
 C/2010 X1 (Elenin) – Seiichi Yoshida @ aerith.net (with pictures taken by different astronomers around the world)
 C/2010 X1 (Elenin) Analysis Light Visual Curve / older ( I.V.O.C.)  : (between May 22 and June 4 magnitude estimates varied from 13.1 to 13.8)
 C/2010 X1 (Elenin) at Astrosite Groningen (magnitude and coma estimates)
 Latest image by Gustavo Muler on 02 August 2011 (comet 1.489AU from Earth)
 Bright Prospects for Comet Elenin? – Sky and Telescope (Kelly Beatty, December 24, 2010)
 So-So Prospects for Comet Elenin – Sky and Telescope (Kelly Beatty, April 12, 2011)
 C/2010 X1 (Elenin) at Kazuo Kinoshita
 
 MPEC 2011-C16 : OBSERVATIONS AND ORBITS OF COMETS (2011 Feb. 5: e = 1.0005, q = 0.4812)
 MPEC 2010-Y12 : OBSERVATIONS AND ORBITS OF COMETS (2010 Dec. 18: Elenin had an assumed eccentricity of 1.0, q = 0.4479)
 MPEC 2010-Y24 : OBSERVATIONS AND ORBITS OF COMETS (2010 Dec. 24: e = 1.0, q = 0.4420)
 MPEC 2011-A08 : OBSERVATIONS AND ORBITS OF COMETS (2011 Jan. 3: e = 1.0, q = 0.4849)
 MPEC 2011-A38 : OBSERVATIONS AND ORBITS OF COMETS (2011 Jan. 10: e = 1.0018, q = 0.4761)
 MPEC 2011-A67 : OBSERVATIONS AND ORBITS OF COMETS (2011 Jan. 15: e = 1.0, q = 0.4824)
 MPEC 2011-B41 : OBSERVATIONS AND ORBITS OF COMETS (2011 Jan. 27: e = 1.0, q = 0.4826)
 Catalogue of Comet Discoveries – Maik Meyer
 The passage of comet C/2010 X1 (Elenin) through the Main Asteroid Belt – (SpaceObs March 1, 2011)
 Conjunction of comet C/2101 X1 with bright galaxies (SpaceObs March 9, 2011)
 GIF animation of Elenin by STEREO-B on 2011-08-01 (constellation Orion on the left)
 Comet Elenin Soars Along (August 26, 2011)
 Southern Comets Homepage – Michael Mattiazzo
 CBET 2801 : 20110831 : COMET C/2010 X1 (ELENIN)
 
 Comet Elenin Self-Destructs, Sky and Telescope

Non-periodic comets
Oort cloud
Destroyed comets